Club Atlético Progreso, also known simply as Progreso, is a professional football club based in Montevideo, Uruguay, that competes in the Uruguayan Primera División.

Progreso's Estadio Abraham Paladino is capable of holding 8,000 spectators.

History
The club was founded on 30 April 1917. The club's first match was played on 26 May 1918, with Progreso beating Club Maroñas 2–0. Progreso won its first title with the Divisional Intermedia (Second Division at that time) in 1938. It went on to win it the next year as well, along with two more championships in 1956 and 1963. The club has three Segunda División championships: in 1945, 1979, and 2005–06. In 1975 and 1978, Progreso won the Tercera División (Segunda División Amateur).

Progreso's first continental participation was in the 1987 Copa Libertadores, where they finished third in a group consisting of fellow Uruguayan club Nacional, and Peruvian clubs San Agustin and Alianza Lima. They participated again in the 1990 edition, since they had won the league the previous year. In that edition, Progreso won their group, which consisted of Defensor Sporting, Pepeganga Margarita, and Mineros de Guayana. They qualified to the Second Round, where they were eliminated by Barcelona of Ecuador.

In 1989, Progreso won the Primera División, the only championship in the history of the Uruguayan league to use a single round-robin format (13 games). This format was due to a calendar conflict with some national and international cups that year. Progreso's president at that time was Dr. Tabaré Vázquez, who later became the president of Uruguay.

Progreso's first team kit in 1917 was white with black stripes. The kit expressed the team's affinity with the anarchist movement. The colors were later changed to red and yellow, the colors of Catalonia, which was known for its identification with the Spanish Revolution.

Performance in CONMEBOL competitions
Copa Libertadores: 3 appearances
1987: Group Stage
1990: Second Round
2020: First Stage

Continental record

Current squad

Out on loan

Managers
This is an incomplete list of Progreso Managers.
 Jorge González (April 2002–Dec 2002)
 Mario Saralegui (Oct 2007–March 2008)
 Raúl Moeller (Jan 2011–June 2011)
 Leonardo Ramos (August 2011–Dec 2012)
 Carlos Rodao (Jan 2013–April 2013)
 Santiago Paz (May 2013–April 2014)
 Juan Carlos Duarte (April 2014–November 2014)
 Rubén Da Silva (November 2014–July 2015)
 Juan Carlos Duarte (December 2015–June 2016)
 Gabriel Añón (July 2016–October 2016)
 Marcelo Méndez (October 2016–November 2018)
 Leonel Rocco (November 2018–November 2020)

Titles
Primera División: 1
 1989

Torneo Competencia: 1
 1985

Uruguayan Segunda División: 3
 1945, 1979, 2005–06

 Divisional Intermedia: 4
 1938, 1939, 1956, 1963

 Uruguayan Segunda División Amateur: 2
1975, 1978

References

External links
 

Progreso
Progreso
Progreso
1917 establishments in Uruguay